Cary Kaplan is the president and co-owner of the sports marketing firm Cosmos Sports & Entertainment with his wife Amelia Kaplan, which launched in 2003.  The company specializes in consulting for sports teams and leagues in sales, marketing and business operations. High-profile clients have included the NHL CFL, MLS, the Chicago Cubs the Houston Rockets and the Phoenix Suns.

Biography 
In 1995, Kaplans's marketing firm Sports Marketing Results had an affiliation with the Canadian National Soccer League. Kaplan then worked for the Edmonton Oilers hockey team for six years, the last two as the president and alternate governor of the Oilers top affiliate, the Hamilton Bulldogs, of the American Hockey League (AHL). In 1999, he won the Ken McKenzie Award as the AHL's top marketing executive. In Hamilton, he was credited with keeping the team in Hamilton when he organized the 'Stay Dogs Stay' campaign in 2000, resulting in increased attendance and tickets sold. He also initiated the process that brought the Montreal Canadiens to take over the Bulldogs franchise and AHL team in the city when the Oilers withdrew following the 2002–03 season.

Kaplan has been owner and president of sports marketing firm Cosmos Sports & Entertainment since August 2003 when he and his wife Amelia opened the business.

From 2005 until October 2009, he served as the commissioner and chairman of Canada's only professional soccer league, the Canadian Soccer League. During his tenure, the league gained affiliations with Canada's governing body, the Canadian Soccer Association, as well as with Canada's top two professional teams Toronto FC and the Montreal Impact, the establishment of a television contract with Rogers TV, and reserve divisions for the league.

In 2013, Kaplan assumed the role of the president of the new Brampton Beast hockey team in the Central Hockey League (CHL). Kaplan was a minority owner that helped bring the first Canadian franchise in the CHL. The seven remaining CHL teams joined the ECHL prior to the 2014–15 season. The Beast folded in February 2021 after not being able to play since March 2020 during the COVID-19 pandemic. The organization also faced many challenges under Kaplan's leadership, including massive debt, staff turnover and being unable to retain or build a fanbase.

In 2019, Kaplan further added the role of being Chief Revenue Officer (CRO) of Global T20 Canada, managing all revenue for the largest cricket event in Canada.

References

Living people
Canadian ice hockey owners
Dalhousie University alumni
1969 births